The Solomon Islands National Club Championship was the former top-tier association football league in the Solomon Islands that ran from 2000 to 2010. It was run by the Solomon Islands Football Federation. The league was replaced by the Telekom S-League which started in the 2010/11 season and is the current top division league in the Solomon Islands.

The winners of the National Club Championship and the league club both played a two legged play-off for a place in the OFC Champions League. This format is used for the current-running league. Koloale FC won it five times, the most out of its 10 year running.

Winners 

 2000 -   Laugu United
 2001 -   Koloale
 2002 -   Koloale
 2003 -   Koloale
 2004 -   Central Realas
 2005/06 - Marist
 2006/07 - Kossa
 2007/08 - Koloale
 2008/09 - Marist
 2009/10 - Koloale

References 

Football leagues in the Solomon Islands
Sports leagues established in 2000
2000 establishments in the Solomon Islands